The Camarera mayor de Palacio (First Lady of the Bedchamber) was the Official of the Royal Household and Heritage of the Crown of Spain, who was in charge of the person and the rooms of the Queen of Spain.

Historical precedents and regime during the 17th and 18th centuries 

This Office was created in 1526 when, during the Habsburg dynasty, the Royal Court was shaped after that one that existed in the Court of Burgundy. Charles V, Holy Roman Emperor, but also King of Spain, imported the etiquette styled in the Court of his paternal grandmother Mary of Burgundy and appointed the first “Camarera mayor de Palacio” for his wife, the Empress.

The principal responsibility of the “Camarera mayor de Palacio” was managing all that was related with the service to the Queen and she had authority over the different dignities and servants that composed her personnel. Her first obligation was the personal assistance to the Sovereign. She had to accompany her at all time, up to the point of sleeping in her chamber, when the King was not doing it.  She was in charge of the clothes purveyors and directed the formal dressing of the Queen. In fact she had the high duty of delivering the Queen the water and the towel during morning toilette. All these functions gave the “Camarera mayor” a great intimacy with the Queen, as well as a big influence over her.

Regime during the 19th and 20th centuries 

In the structure of the Royal Household, the Office “Camarera mayor de Palacio” had the same category as that of the Mayordomo mayor. Only a woman with the rank of Grandee of Spain could be nominated for this Office, and she was chosen between those of the class of “Dama de la Reina” (Lady of the Bedchamber) of major seniority. She was in charge of everything relative to the etiquette and organization of the Household of the Queen helped by the “Mayordomo mayor” (High Steward) to the Queen.

Between her duties there were signalling the dates for audiences to the Queen and accompanying her in every ceremony.

Under the “Camarera mayor de Palacio” they were the “Damas de la Reina” (Ladies of the Bedchamber) and the “Damas al servicio particular de la Reina” (Ladies-in-Waiting).

She had assigned an annual salary of 6.000 pesetas and had a private own office in the Royal Palace of Madrid.

She was styled “Excelentísima señora Camarera mayor de Palacio”.

This post was suppressed after the proclamation of the Second Spanish Republic in 1931 and never re-created after the restoration of Monarchy in 1975.

List of “Camareras Mayores” (First Ladies of the Bedchamber) to the Queen of Spain between 1526 and 1931

“Camarera mayor” to Empress Isabella of Portugal, 1526-1539  

1526-1546: Leonor de Castro y Meneses, Duchess of Gandía, Grandee of Spain

“Camareras mayores” to Queen Anna of Austria, 1570-1580  

 1570-1571: Aldonza de Bazán, Marchioness of Fromista, Grandee of Spain
 1571-1576: María Ángela de Aragón y Guzmán, Marchioness of Berlanga, Grandee of Spain
 1576-1580: Francisca de Rojas y Sandoval,  Countess of  Paredes de Nava, Grandee of Spain

“Camareras mayores” to Queen Margaret of Austria, 1601-1611  

 1601-1603: Catalina de la Cerda, Duchess of Lerma, Grandee of Spain
 1603-1611: Catalina de Sandoval, Countess of Lemos, Grandee of Spain

“Camareras mayores” to Queen Elisabeth of France, 1615-1644  

 1615-1621: Catalina de Sandoval, Countess of Lemos, Grandee of Spain
 1621-1627: Juana Enriquez de Velasco, Duchess of Gandía, Grandee of Spain
 1627-1643:  Inés de Zúñiga, Countess of Olivares, Grandee of Spain

“Camareras mayores” to Queen Mariana of Austria, 1649-1665  

 1649-1653: Ana de Cardona y Aragón, Countess of  Medellín, Grandee of Spain
 1654-1659: Elvira Ponce de León, Marchioness of Villanueva de Valdueza
 1660-1665: Margarita Zapata de Mendoza, Countess of  Priego, Grandee of Spain

“Camareras mayores” to Queen Marie Louise of Orléans, 1679-1689  

 1679-1680: Juana de Aragón y Cortés, Duchess of Terranova, Grandee of Spain
 1680-1689: Juana de Armendáriz, Duchess dowager of Alburquerque, Grandee of Spain

“Camareras mayores” to Queen Maria Anna of Neuburg, 1689-1701  
 
 1689-1696: Juana de Armendáriz, Duchess dowager of Alburquerque, Grandee of Spain
 1696-1701: María Teresa de Benavides, Duchess of Frías, Grandee of Spain

“Camareras mayores” to Queen Maria Luisa of Savoy, 1700-1714  
 
 1702-1704:  Marie Anne de La Trémoille, princesse des Ursins
 1704-1706:  María Alberta de Castro, Duchess of Béjar, Grandee of Spain
 1706-1714:  Marie Anne de La Trémoille, princesse des Ursins

“Camarera mayor” to Queen Elisabeth Farnese, 1714-1724  

 1714-1724: Ángela Foch de Aragón,  Countess dowager of  Altamira, Grandee of Spain

“Camarera mayor” to Queen Louise Élisabeth of Orléans, 1724  
 
 1724: Ángela Foch de Aragón, Dowager Countess of  Altamira, Grandee of Spain

“Camareras mayores” to Queen Elisabeth Farnese, 1724-1746  
 
 1724-1737: Ángela Foch de Aragón, Dowager Countess of  Altamira, Grandee of Spain
 1737-1746: Laura Castelví y Coloma, Marchioness dowager of Torrecuso

“Camarera mayor” to Queen Barbara of Portugal, 1746-1758  

 1746-1759: Rosa María de Castro, Marchioness of Aytona, Grandee of Spain

“Camarera mayor” to Queen Maria Amalia of Saxony, 1759-1760  

 1759-1760: Rosa María de Castro, Marchioness of Aytona, Grandee of Spain

“Camareras mayores” to Queen Maria Luisa of Parma, 1788-1808  

 1788-1793: Florentina de Pizarro Picolomino, Marchioness dowager of Bélgida, Grandee of Spain
 1792-1808: María Isidra de la Cerda y Guzmán, Duchess of Nájera, Grandee of Spain

“Camarera mayor” to Queen Maria Isabel of Portugal, 1814-1818  

 1814-1818: Antonia Fernández de Cordoba Sarmiento, Countess of la Puebla del Maestre, Grandee of Spain

“Camareras mayores” to Queen Maria Josepha Amalia of Saxony, 1818-1829  

 1819-1823: Maria Josefa Contreras y Vargas Machuca, Countess of Alcudia, Grandee of Spain
 1823-1829: María Cayetana Acuña y Dewitte, Marchioness of Bedmar, Grandee of Spain

“Camarera mayor” to Queen Maria Cristina of the Two Sicilies, 1829-1833  

 1829-1834: María Cayetana Acuña y Dewitte, Marchioness of Bedmar, Grandee of Spain

“Camareras mayores” to Queen Isabella II, 1833-1868 

 1834-1841: Joaquina María del Pilar Téllez-Girón y Alfonso Pimentel, Marchioness of Santa Cruz de Mudela, Grandee of Spain
 1841-1842: Luisa Álvarez de las Asturias Bohórquez y Guiráldez, Marchioness of Bélgida, Grandee of Spain
 1842-1843:  Juana de Vega, Countess of Espoz y Mina
 1843- 1847: Joaquina María del Pilar Téllez-Girón y Alfonso Pimentel, Marchioness of Santa Cruz de Mudela, Grandee of Spain
 1847-1848: María Manuela Kirpatrick de Closeburn, Countess widower of Montijo, Grandee of Spain
 1848-1854:  María de la O Guiráldez y Cañas,  Duchess of Gor, Grandee of Spain
 1855-1866:  Rosalía Ventimiglia y Moncada d,Aragona, Duchess widower of Berwick and Alba, Grandee of Spain
 1866-1867:  María de la O Guiráldez y Cañas,  Duchess of Gor, Grandee of Spain
 1867-1868: María de la Encarnación Álvarez de las Asturias Bohórquez y Guiráldez, Marchioness of Novaliches, Grandee of Spain

“Camarera mayor” to Queen Mercedes of Orléans and Maria Cristina of Austria, 1875-1884 

 1875-1884:  María de la Encarnación Fernández de Córdoba y Álvarez de las Asturias Bohorques,  Marchioness of Santa Cruz de Mudela, Grandee of Spain

“Camareras mayores” to Queen Maria Cristina of Austria, 1884-1906 

 1884-1888: María Eulalia Osorio de Moscoso y Carvajal,  Duchess of Medina de las Torres, Grandee of Spain
1888-1905:  María Soledad Fernández de Córdoba y Alagón, Countess of  Sástago, Grandee of Spain
1905-1906: María Luisa Cárvajal y Dávalos, Duchess of  San Carlos, Marchioness widower of  Santa Cruz de Mudela, Grandee of Spain

“Camarera mayor” to Queen Victoria Eugenie of Battenberg, 1906-1931 

1906-1931: María Luisa Cárvajal y Dávalos, Duchess of  San Carlos, Marchioness widower of  Santa Cruz de Mudela, Grandee of Spain

List of "Camareras mayores" to Queen Mother Maria Cristina of Austria, 1906-1929 

During the reign of King Alfonso XIII, and after his marriage,  it was created the own Household of her mother the Queen Maria Cristina of Austria with her own “Camarera mayor de la Reina Madre” (First Lady of the Bedchamber of the Queen Mother). This Office was successively held by:

1906-1923: Maria Natividad Quindos Villaroel, Duchess of La Conquista, Marchioness of San Saturnino, Grandee of Spain
1923-1929: Maria Concepcion Martos Zabalburu, Countess of Heredia Spinola, Grandee of Spain

See also
 Chief Court Mistress, Dutch, German, Scandinavian and Russian equivalent 
 Mistress of the Robes, British equivalent 
 Première dame d'honneur, French equivalent 
 Surintendante de la Maison de la Reine, French equivalent

References 

 Enciclopedia universal ilustrada europeo-americana. Volume 49. Hijos de J. Espasa, Editores.1923
 Archivo General de Palacio (AGP) . Patrimonio Nacional. Sección Personal

Royal households
Spanish monarchy
Spanish royal court